Yau Kom Tau or Yau Kam Tau may refer to:

 Yau Kom Tau (Tsing Yi) on Tsing Yi island, Hong Kong
 Yau Kom Tau (Tsuen Wan District) in the Tsuen Wan District of Hong Kong. Yau Kom Tau Village is located in this area.